The Lahore Qalandars (often abbreviated as LQ) is a franchise cricket team based in Lahore, Punjab in the Pakistan Super League (PSL) that competed in 2020 Pakistan Super League. They are one of the six team that competed in Pakistan Super League. The team was coached by Aaqib Javed and captained by Sohail Akhtar.

Season standings

Points table

League stage

References

External Links 
 Team records in 2021 at ESPNcricinfo

2021 in Punjab, Pakistan
2021 Pakistan Super League
Qalandars in 2021
2021